Shuocheng District, formerly Shuo County, is the main urban district of the prefecture-level city of Shuozhou in Shanxi province, China.

History

Yinguan, in present-day Shuocheng District's Xiaguancheng Village, was the seat of another county and of all of Yanmen Commandery during the Eastern Han. The post was moved to Guangwu near present-day Daixian under the Kingdom of Wei.

References

Citations

Bibliography

www.xzqh.org 
 .
 .

County-level divisions of Shanxi
Shuozhou